El Empalme may refer to:
El Empalme Canton, a canton of Ecuador
El Empalme, Ecuador, capital city of the El Empalme Canton
El Empalme, Bocas del Toro, Panama